The first season of the Japanese anime television series Gintama is directed by Shinji Takamatsu and animated by Sunrise. It aired on TV Tokyo from April 4, 2006 to March 29, 2007 with a total of 49 episodes. The anime is based on Hideaki Sorachi's manga of the same name. The story revolves around an eccentric samurai, Gintoki Sakata, his apprentice, Shinpachi Shimura, and a teenage alien girl named Kagura. All three are "free-lancers" who search for work in order to pay the monthly rent, which usually goes unpaid anyway.

In Japan, Aniplex distributes the anime in DVD format. A total of thirteen volumes were released for the first season, between  July 26, 2006 and June 26, 2007. 

On January 8, 2009, the streaming video site Crunchyroll began offering English subtitled episodes of the series. The episodes are available on Crunchyroll within hours of airing in Japan to paying members. The episodes can also be watched for free a week after release. The first available episode was episode 139. On the same day, Crunchyroll also began uploading episodes from the beginning of the series at a rate of two a week. The anime is licensed by Sentai Filmworks, with distribution from Section23 Films. The first collection containing thirteen episodes will be released on DVD, April 27, 2010.

This season uses six musical pieces: two opening themes and four ending themes. The first 24 episodes feature "Pray" by Tommy heavenly6. It is replaced in episode 14 by  "Mr. Raindrop" from Amplified, which used until episode 24. Besides the regular themes, episode 12 uses a remixed version of "Fūsen Gamu". Episode 49 changes "Kyandi Line" as an opening, while the ending is a remix of "Tōi Nioi".



Episode list

References
General

Specific

2006 Japanese television seasons
2007 Japanese television seasons
Season 1